The Edinburgh Film Guild (EFG) is a film society based in Edinburgh, Scotland. Founded in 1929, it is notable as the oldest continuously running film society in the world.

Summary
The Edinburgh Film Guild is a community organization dedicated to promoting and showcasing independent and international films. The guild has a long history of organizing film festivals, screenings, and educational events, and has played a vital role in bringing cinema of all genres to the people of Edinburgh and the surrounding area.

Over the years, the Film Guild has adapted and evolved, always striving to bring the best in film to its members and the community. Today, the guild offers a wide range of programming, including film screenings, and educational events. The EFG screens films at several venues including the French Institute for Scotland.

The Guild attracts film enthusiasts who are interested in independent and international films, and who are looking for a community of like-minded individuals to share their passion for film in its many forms and cultural origins.

Members of the Film Guild include people of all ages and backgrounds, from students and young professionals to retirees and older film lovers. They may be avid fans of cinema, academics and filmmakers.

In addition to its regular membership, the Film Guild may also attract visitors and film lovers from outside the local area, who are interested in experiencing the unique programming and events offered by the organization. 

The Guild has a strong sense of community and inclusivity. As a community-based organization, the Guild has a long history of working with local schools and community groups to bring film screenings and educational events to underserved areas in the community. The Guild is committed to making film accessible to everyone, regardless of their background or circumstances.

History
Though pre-dated by the original (London) Film Society, founded five years earlier, it has outlasted it, with the Film Society having ceased operation in 1939. The EFG is also of note for having established the Edinburgh International Film Festival in 1947.

According to Scottish film theorist and documentarian John Grierson the EFG was of particular importance for promoting a wide view of cinema. Writing in 1951 he commented:

"The old London Film Society was the first to break from somewhat exclusive attention to the avant-garde and take the longer and harder way of the Russians and more purposive users of the cinema. But it was the Edinburgh Film Guild which completed the movement - as the London Film Society did not - and saw the infinite variety of a Film Society's obligations to all categories of the medium".

From 1980 until 2022, the EFG was based in the Filmhouse Cinema in Lothian Road, Edinburgh, where it has its clubrooms, offices and cinema. Since the Filmhouse entered administration the Guild has continued to offer screenings and its educational programme.

Organisation
Run by volunteers on a non-profit basis, and is a company with charitable status. The programme is organised on the basis of mini-seasons linked by some common element, of director, performer, country, genre or theme.

References

External links
  A history of the Edinburgh Film Guild by critic Philip French, emphasising its distinctive contributions to Scottish and UK film culture
  Newspaper obituary for Forsyth Hardy, a co-founder of the Edinburgh Film Guild and the Edinburgh International Film Festival

Film societies in the United Kingdom
Film organisations in Scotland
Arts organizations established in 1929
1929 establishments in Scotland